Transmissibility, in the context of Structural Dynamics, can be defined as the ratio of the maximum force on the floor as a result of the vibration of a machine to the maximum machine force:

Further reading
 Vibration Control and Measurement
 Tech Tip: Spring & Dampers, Episode Four

Structural analysis